Kookamunga may refer to:

 Kookamunga National Forest, a fictional location in the animated series Iggy Arbuckle
 Cucamonga Valley in California, US
 Rancho Cucamonga, California, a city